P. pastoris  may refer to:
 Pichia pastoris, a methylotrophic yeast species
 Potthastia pastoris, a midge species found in Europe
 Prosthechea pastoris, an orchid species in the genus Prosthechea